The Embassy of Bahrain in Islamabad is the diplomatic mission of Bahrain to Pakistan. It is located at House No. 12, Street 2 in Sector F-6/3, Islamabad. Bahrain also has a consulate-general in Karachi.

The current embassy building was inaugurated in 2006 by Salman, Crown Prince of Bahrain. The embassy promotes bilateral relations between Bahrain and Pakistan, and provides consular services for Bahraini citizens in the country. Its operating hours are between 8.30am and 3.30pm from Mondays to Thursdays, and 8.30am to 1.30pm on Fridays.

The current Bahraini ambassador to Pakistan is Mohamed Ebrahim Mohamed Abdulqader.

References

External links
  

Bahrain–Pakistan relations
Bahrain
Islamabad